Patrick "Pat" Herbert (born 1953) is an Irish retired hurler who played as a left corner-back for the Limerick senior team.

Herbert was born in Castleconnell, County Limerick. His senior debut came during the 1977 championship. Herbert immediately became a regular member of the starting fifteen and won one Munster medal and two National Hurling League medals. He was an All-Ireland runner-up on one occasion.

As a member of the Munster inter-provincial team on a number of occasions, Herbert won two Railway Cup medals. At club level he enjoyed a lengthy career with Ahane.

He made 16 championship appearances during his career, and retired following the conclusion of the 1986 championship.

Following his retirement from active playing, he turned to management and coaching. He guided Toomevara and Oulart the Ballagh to championship successes in their respective counties.

Honours

Player

Limerick
Munster Senior Hurling Championship (2): 1980 (sub), 1981
National Hurling League (2): 1983-84, 1984-85

Munster
Railway Cup (2): 1984, 1985

Manager

Toomevara
Tipperary Senior Hurling Championship (1): 2006

Oulart the Ballagh
Wexford Senior Hurling Championship (1): 2012

References

1953 births
Living people
Ahane hurlers
Limerick inter-county hurlers
Munster inter-provincial hurlers
Hurling managers